St. Luke's Church Stapleford is a parish church in the Church of England in Stapleford, Nottinghamshire.

History
The church is a mission church. It is on Moorbridge Lane.

Current parish status
St. Luke's Church, Stapleford is looked after by its mother church, St. Helen's Church, Stapleford

Sources

Stapleford